Sandra Kogut is a filmmaker born 1965 in Rio de Janeiro, Brazil, whose works transition between documentary and narrative fiction.  She first received international attention for her 1991 documentary Paralamas do Sucesso.  Kogut has taught at renowned universities around the world and has worked for Brazilian and European broadcasters.  Her debut feature film project was the multi award-winning Mutum in 2007. She is more recently known for Campo Grande (2015), which had its premiere in the Contemporary World Cinema section of the 2015 Toronto International Film Festival.

Background
Kogut is of Hungarian descent and was born in Rio de Janeiro in 1965.  She spent more than ten years living in France, before moving to the United States.  She graduated in philosophy from the Catholic University of Rio de Janeiro, and began her career as a performance and installation artist in 1984.  Among other venues, Her works have been shown at the Museum of Modern Art and Guggenheim Museum in New York City.  Her grandparents migrated to Brazil from Hungary to avoid The Holocaust, and it was their experiences which inspired her film A Hungarian Passport.

Filmography
 Paralamas do Sucesso (1988 documentary) 
 Angola (1991) 
 Parabolic People (1991)
 En français (1993)
 Here and There (Lá e Cá) (1995)
 Adiu monde or Pierre and Claire's Story (Adieu monde ou l'histoire de Pierre et Claire) (1998 documentary)
 Lecy e Humberto nos Campos Neutrais - Chuí - Chuy (1999) 
 A Hungarian Passport (Un passeport Hongrois) (2001 documentary)
 Passengers of Orsay (Passagers d'Orsay) (2002)
 Mutum (2007)
 Campo Grande (2015)
 Three Summers (2019)

Recognition
While Kogut was residing in Paris, France, Harvard Film Archive wrote of her works being archived by their Carpenter Center for the Visual Arts and stated that she "has emerged as one of the most distinctive cultural filmmakers at work today. Her films are by turns whimsical, lyrical, and finely ironic—lighthearted and playful, yet also momentous and serious."

Awards and nominations
 1995, won 'Main Prize' at International Short Film Festival Oberhausen for En français
 1998, won 'Special mention' at Marseille Festival of Documentary Film for Adieu monde ou l'histoire de Pierre et Claire
 1998, won 'Silver Dove for Short Footage' at Leipzig DOK Festival for Adieu monde ou l'histoire de Pierre et Claire
 1999, won 'Prize of the Catholic Filmwork Germany' at International Short Film Festival Oberhausen for Adieu monde ou l'histoire de Pierre et Claire
 1999, won 'Prize of the Ministry for Development, Culture and Sports' at International Short Film Festival Oberhausen for Adieu monde ou l'histoire de Pierre et Claire
 2004, nominated for Grand Prize for 'Best Documentary' at Cinema Brazil Grand Prize for Un passeport Hongrois 
 2004, nominated for ACIE Award for 'Best Documentary' from Associação dos Correspondentes de Imprensa Estrangeira at ACIE Awards, Brazil for Un passeport Hongrois
 2007, won Silver Precolumbian Circle for Best Feature Film at Bogota Film Festival for Mutum
 2007, won Feisal Award at Bogota Film Festival for Mutum
 2007, received Critics' Award at Bogota Film Festival for Mutum
 2007, nominated for Caméra d'Or at Cannes Film Festival for Mutum
 2007, won Prize of the Ecumenical Jury Special Mention at Molodist International Film Festival for Mutum
 2007, won Première Brazil for "best Film' at Rio de Janeiro International Film Festival for Mutum
 2008, nominated for Grand Prize for 'Best Screenplay' at Cinema Brazil Grand Prize for Mutum
 2008, won Coxiponé Award for 'Best Director' at Cuiabá Film and Video Festival for Mutum
 2008, won Dioraphte Award at Rotterdam International Film Festival for Mutum
 2008, won Silver Daisy at Silver Daisy Awards, Brazil for Mutum
 2008, won Coxiponé Award for 'Best Film' at Cuiabá Film and Video Festival for Mutum
 2008, won Coxiponé Award for 'Best Screenplay' at Cuiabá Film and Video Festival for Mutum
 2008, won Grand Coral for 'First Work' at Havana Film Festival for Mutum
 2008, won Crystal Lens for 'Best Director' at Miami Brazilian Film Festival for Mutum
 2008, won Jury Award for 'best Film at Paris Brazilian Film Festival for Mutum
 2008, won 'Deutsches Kinderhilfswerk Special Mention' at Berlin International Film Festival for Mutum
 2008, nominated for ACIE Award for 'Best Film' from Associação dos Correspondentes de Imprensa Estrangeira at ACIE Awards, Brazil for Mutum
 2008, nominated for ACIE Award for 'Best Director' from Associação dos Correspondentes de Imprensa Estrangeira at ACIE Awards, Brazil for Mutum

References

External links
 

Living people
1965 births
Brazilian film directors
Pontifical Catholic University of Rio de Janeiro alumni